A meikeerthi is the first section of Tamil inscriptions of grant issued by ancient Tamil kings of South India. Meikeerthis of various stone and metal inscriptions serve as important archaeological sources for determining Tamil History.

Description
Meikeerthi is a Tamil word meaning "true fame". During the rule of Rajaraja Chola I it became common practice to begin inscriptions of grant with a standard praise for the king's achievements and conquests. This practice was adopted by Raja Raja's descendants and the later Pandya kings. The length of a meikeerthi may vary from a few lines to a few paragraphs. Only the start of a particular king's meikeerthi remains constant in all his inscriptions and the content varies depending upon the year of his reign the inscription was issued (as he might have made new conquests or new grants since the previous inscription was made). Meikeerthis do not mention a calendar year. Instead they always mention the year of the king's reign in which the inscription was made.

Historical sources
The inscriptions function as historical sources for differentiating the kings of the same name belonging to a particular dynasty. Almost without exception, the meikeerthi of a particular king begins with a unique phrase and this helps to differentiate kings with similar names or titles. For example, amongst the later Pandyan kings there were at least three who were named Jatavarman Kulasekaran. By using the meikeerthi found in their inscriptions, they are identified as follows

They also mention the names of the king's consorts, his conquests, vanquished enemies, vassals and seats of power. As early Tamil records are not dated in any well known calendar, the regnal year mentioned in meikeerthis are important in dating Tamil history. The year of the reign when taken along with contemporary historical records such as the Mahavamsa and accounts of foreign travelers like Abdulla Wassaf, Amir Khusrow and Ibn Battuta helps to determine the chronology of the Chola and Pandya dynasties. Sometimes the king is not identified by name but by an accomplishment (conquest, battle or grant). For example, the Chola prince Aditya Karikalan's meikeerthi refers to him only as "The king who took Vira Pandiyan's head" without naming him.

Noted examples

Notes

References
 
 

Tamil history